Green Harvest (Spanish: Siega verde) is a 1961 Spanish film directed by Rafael Gil.

The film's set and art director was Enrique Alarcón.

Cast

Rafael Bardem
José María Caffarel
María de los Ángeles Hortelano
Luis Induni as Janot
Carlos Larrañaga as Enric Pujalt

Guillermo Marín
Matilde Muñoz Sampedro
Luz Márquez
Consuelo de Nieva
Elvira Quintillá
Pepe Rubio
Jeanne Valérie as Jana

References

External links

Spanish drama films
Films directed by Rafael Gil
1960s Spanish films